Tachytes intermedius is a species of square-headed wasp in the family Crabronidae. It is found in Central America and North America.

References

Further reading

 
 
 

Crabronidae
Insects described in 1906